The Prime Minister's New Year Message in the United Kingdom is an annual speech made by the Prime Minister for the start of a new year. It is traditionally released around New Year's Eve and Hogmanay throughout Britain, consisting of a speech which is a few minutes long and usually contains reflections upon what has taken place throughout the previous year. This is then followed by a government-backed preview of what can be expected in the coming new year and the current political state of the nation. Beyond politics, the message also includes sentiments and achievements from throughout the year, and national events that have taken place.

Other political leaders in Britain use the new year as a chance to release their message to reflect on the year and inform the public on what may be expected in the coming year, this includes the Leader of the Opposition in the British Parliament and leaders of the devolved governments. Since 1932, the British monarch traditionally releases the Royal Christmas Message which is alternatively broadcast on Christmas Day throughout the UK and the Commonwealth.

Past messages

2010s

2020s

See also
 Royal Christmas Message

References

External links
 Official website
 Prime Minister's Office: press briefings

Speeches
 
 
Annual events in the United Kingdom
New Year Message